Mabella may refer to:
510 Mabella, minor planet
Mabella (brachiopod), genus of brachiopod
Mabella, Sierra Leone, inhabited place in Sierra Leone